Monato Esprit is a 3D, fantasy-themed massively multiplayer online role-playing game. The game is currently in the open beta stage of development and is tentatively scheduled for release in July, 2009. Monato Esprit is free to download and uses the e-currency "MetaTIX" as its billing system.

Gameplay
Monato Esprit follows many of the traditional structures of other MMORPGs. Players take control of an avatar (or "character") within a persistent world. Characters explore the landscape, delve through dungeons, fight monsters, complete quests, and interact with NPCs as well as other players. Successfully defeating monsters and completing quests yields items and experience points. As characters gain levels, they have the opportunity to use more powerful skills and better equipment. Characters can group together into parties and work together to achieve short-term goals, or create guilds, which serve as long-term social networks.

Combat
Combat is designed to accommodate younger and casual players. The game features strictly player versus environment action and emphasizes cooperation between players. The interface is simple and primarily mouse-driven, with a third-person perspective and a movable camera. To enter combat, players click on monsters they encounter in the world. Each successful strike results in damage to the monster's hit points, while the monster attacks in turn. Characters that lose all their hit points are revived in the nearest safe point, and there is no further punishment for defeat. If a monster loses all of its hit points, it is defeated and can be looted for items. Party members can select various "looting modes" to determine how items are divided up.

Each character has a number of skills to augment his or her combat potential. When characters gain a level, they receive a skill point that can be used to buy a rank in a skill. At least one rank is required to use a skill, and further ranks increase its effectiveness. The skills available for purchase are dependent on the character's level and class. Each class has its own unique skill roster, with more powerful skills becoming available as the character gains levels. Skills are broken into two categories: passive and active. Passive skills permanently increase the character's attributes and are always functioning. Active skills include attack spells, special melee strikes, healing, and temporary enchantments. Using an active skill costs mana, which limits the number of times a skill can be used over a short period.

Inventory
Characters earn items by defeating monsters, completing quests, and trading with other players. Items are stored in the character's inventory, which is divide into a number of bags with 16 slots each. Some items such as weapons take up an entire slot, while smaller items such as potions stack together in a single slot. Each character starts with two bags, and can gain more at higher levels. Players can map items to hotkeys by placing them in their "quick bar". Excess items can be stored in the bank. All cities in Monato Esprit provide access to the bank, which can hold an additional 25 slots of inventory.

Characters also have 10 equipment slots for items that they wear, which include armor, jewelry, wings and weapons. Character models change to reflect what weapons and armor the character is currently wearing. Weapons and armor have endurance ratings that will lower over time as they are worn during combat. When an item's endurance rating reaches zero, it will become unusable. Items can be repaired by blacksmiths in cities at the cost of MetaTIX. Jewelry and wings do not have endurance ratings and never need repair.

Some items can be combined to create new items with alchemy. Characters learn how to create items by finding alchemy recipes. Each recipe includes three to six types of ingredients. The more powerful the item, the more challenging it is to find the necessary ingredients. Common items made through alchemy include potions, which restore hit points and mana. Characters can also find enchantment scrolls that add magical bonuses to equipment. Enchantments can only be performed by Alchemist NPCs in cities, at the cost of MetaTIX.

World

Setting

The game takes place in Monato Esprit, a magical world where the dreams of the innocent have created a paradise of imagination. Monato Esprit is maintained by the Basileus Crystal, which focuses the energy of moonlight to power the world. Dreamers are ushered into the world by the radiance of the crystal to become Archons, a race of humanoids with wings. Archons have built great civilizations throughout the dreamworld and enjoyed a golden age of peace and prosperity.

A short time before the setting of the game, a dark presence descended upon Monato Esprit and infected the Basileus Crystal, allowing Nightmares to manifest in the dreamworld. Nightmares corrupted the harmless plants and creatures of Monato Esprit and turned them into monsters. The Archons must now rise against these monsters to protect their fragile paradise.

Players begin the game as a young dreamer who enters Monato Esprit for the first time. After receiving tutorial missions from several helpful Archons, the player can teleport to Isildra, the first city in the game. From that point, the player is free to adventure through the world as he or she wishes.

Zones
The world of Monato Esprit is divided into zones, which come in three categories: cities, countryside, and instance dungeons. City zones are urban settlements created by the Archons. They feature a large number of friendly NPCs and are completely free of monsters. Within city zones, players can receive and complete quests without fear of attack. Cities also serve as convenient meeting grounds for parties and guilds. Countryside zones are wilder areas of the world that have become infested with nightmares. Some countryside zones feature small Archon settlements with friendly NPCs, but these areas are not safe from monster attacks. Instance dungeons are special areas separated from the main world and can only be accessed through a gatekeeper. While inside an instance dungeon, characters' maps do not function, forcing players to find their own way through the maze. The objective for each dungeon is to find and defeat its boss. Although these areas are generically known as "dungeons", they come in a variety of visual styles, from catacombs to sunny forests.

Crystals
The world of Monato Esprit is powered by Crystals, which provide magical benefits to characters who stand near them. Red crystals heal hit points, blue crystals restore mana, and yellow crystals restore both. Because characters' hit points and mana do not naturally regenerate over time, crystals are a valuable resource for characters who are short on potions.

Characters
All player characters are young Archons, a race of winged humanoids. During character creation, players have the opportunity to customize their characters' appearance, modifying their gender, hair style, hair color, eye shape, and eye color. Players also choose a zodiac sign and season for their characters at creation. Archons receive bonuses such as an increase in attack damage or hit points depending on the sign and season to which they are aligned.

Each player account can store up to three characters at one time.

Classes
All characters begin the game as a "Novice" until fifth level, at which point the player chooses one of six specialized classes. Class determines how many hit points and mana points characters receive each level, what equipment they can use, and which skills they can buy. Characters that have reached tenth level in a class can become "reborn" and restart in another class at level one. Available classes are:

Hwarang - The elite warriors of Monato Esprit, focusing on offensive melee combat. They fight with two-handed swords for maximum damage, and wear metal armor. Their skills include powerful sword strikes and elemental attacks. The class is based on the historical warrior society of Korea.
Templar - A society of powerful guardians who are charged with defending temples and other holy places. Templars specialize in defensive combat, wielding swords and shields and wearing metal armor. Their skills include powerful strikes as well as defensive enchantments that make them almost impossible to injure. The class is based on the medieval military order.
Mage - Masters of the four elements, Mages wield destructive magic. Their skills include long-range attack spells as well as enchantments that augment their offensive potential. They are physically weak, however, and only wear cloth armor. Their staffs serve as melee weapons and also increase the power of their spells.
Cleric - Holy caretakers of the dreamworld, Clerics use the healing power of dreams to protect and restore the wounded. This class serves a vital support role in any party, casting enchantments to protect and heal party members. Clerics are not particularly suited to melee combat. They wear cloth armor and wield wands that heighten the power of their magic.
Sheriff - These dedicated peace officers bring justice to the wild places in the dreamworld. Sheriffs specialize in long-range combat with firearms, and are the only Archons who are trained to use them. This class is based on the gunslinger archetype of the American Old West.
Harlequin - Cunning rogues who wander the dreamworld in search of adventure. Harlequins are known as much for their showmanship as their power, fighting with such daring that every combat becomes a work of art. This class is loosely based on the comical theater characters.

In-game economy
Monato Esprit is the first MMO to use the e-currency MetaTIX. Players purchase MetaTIX and use them like admission tickets to gain entrance to special areas in the world and purchase various services such as teleportation. MetaTIX also serve as the in-game currency for the world of Monato Esprit, much like "gold" in other MMOs, and can be used to purchase items from other players. There are no merchant NPCs in the game world, so all trade is conducted between players. This system allows the player community to determine items' value and regulate the economy without developer interference.

The economic system in Monato Esprit is based on the research of Edward Castronova into the real world economy at work in EverQuest. Castronova discovered that a unit of currency in Norrath was worth more than the Yen or Lira, and playing EverQuest yielded more wealth per hour than the average wage of a Bulgarian worker. While other MMOs such as EverQuest and World of Warcraft attempt to restrict players from earning profit through gaming, Monato Esprit has built the concept into the game itself. Players can use the profits they earn in Monato Esprit to buy and play new games that accept the currency.

Production
Monato Esprit is under development by the Korean company Gamasoft. The English language release is being published by Reality Gap, Inc. The Russian language release in being published by IT Territory, LLC (part of Astrum Online Entertainment holding). The game is currently in the open beta stage of production.

References

External links
Gamasoft website
IT Territory, LLC website
2009 video games
Massively multiplayer online role-playing games
Windows games
Windows-only games
Video games developed in South Korea
Fantasy video games